Phang Nga Province Stadium is a multi-purpose stadium in Phang Nga, Phang Nga Province, Thailand. It is currently used mostly for football matches and is the home stadium of Phang Nga F.C.  The stadium holds 3,000 people.

Multi-purpose stadiums in Thailand
Phang Nga F.C.